Azmy Qowimuramadhoni (born 1 January 1999) is an Indonesian-born Azerbaijani badminton player. Playing in men's singles and men's doubles, he became an Azerbaijani naturalized citizen in 2018.

Achievements

BWF International Challenge/Series (7 titles, 4 runners-up) 
Men's singles

Men's doubles

  BWF International Challenge tournament
  BWF International Series tournament
  BWF Future Series tournament

BWF Junior International (1 titles, 2 runners-up) 
Men's single

Men's doubles

  BWF Junior International Grand Prix tournament
  BWF Junior International Challenge tournament
  BWF Junior International Series tournament
  BWF Junior Future Series tournament

Performance timeline 
Performance timeline

National team 
 Senior level

Individual competitions

Senior level

Men's singles

Men's doubles

References

External links 
 

1999 births
Living people
Indonesian male badminton players
Naturalized citizens of Azerbaijan
Azerbaijani male badminton players
European Games competitors for Azerbaijan
Badminton players at the 2019 European Games